Ghanashyam Nayak (12 May 1944 – 3 October 2021) was an Indian drama, film and television actor. He had appeared in a number of tele serials, drama as well as films. He achieved fame as a child artist in the 1960 movie Masoom and the song "Nani Teri Morni Ko Mor Le Gaye". His last memorable role was of Natwarlal Prabhashankar Udhaiwala a.k.a. Nattu Kaka in Taarak Mehta Ka Ooltah Chashmah.

Early life 
Nayak was born on 12 May 1944 in Undhai village in Mehsana district. He was son of Ranglal Nayak who was associated with Gujarati drama as music director.

Career 
He started as child artist in drama and Hindi films and gradually worked towards comedy and character roles. Bhavai was one of his popular act. He played a Bhavai actor in Hum Dil De Chuke Sanam with Aishwarya Rai Bachchan.
He had appeared in approximately 100 Gujarati and Hindi films and around 350 Hindi television series. He also acted in more than 100 Gujarati stage plays. He gave playback in more than 12 Gujarati films with maestros like Asha Bhosle & Mahendra Kapoor. He also dubbed more than 350 Gujarati films.

Death and funeral 
Speaking to ETimes, Vikas mentioned that the treatment of the cancer was tough since there was no set line of medicine considering it was a rare form of cancer. Even though the chemotherapy worked for some time and it seemed like it showed results, Nayak's health kept deteriorating and cancer spread to his entire body within one year.

Nayak died on 3 October 2021 from a rare form of cancer. He had wanted to die with makeup on.

Nayak's funeral was conducted the next day, on 4 October 2021. His last wish was fulfilled by his son who had a professional makeup artist do his father's makeup as he began his final journey towards his heavenly abode. In his latest interview with a news daily, Nayak's son, Vikas opened up on how the family supported him and stayed with him throughout the difficult phase.

Gujarati film Tu Rajee Re (2022) starring Nayak was released posthumously.

Filmography

Television
Shreeman Shreemati  (1994 TV series) - Kishan Khichdi (Hindi) as SalesmanManiMatku (Gujarati) as Matkalal (Lead Hero)Philips Top 10 as MakhkhanEk Mahal Ho Sapno Ka as MohanDill mill gaye as patientSarathi as Ghanu KakaSarabhai vs Sarabhai (2004) as Vitthal KakaTaarak Mehta Ka Ooltah Chashmah (2008–2021) as Natwarlal Prabhashankar Udhaiwala a.k.a. Nattu KakaChhuta Chheda'' (2012) (Gujarati)

Films

References

External links
 

1945 births
2021 deaths
20th-century Indian male actors
21st-century Indian male actors
Deaths from cancer in India
Indian male television actors
Male actors from Mumbai